George Henry Waite (1 March 1894 – q2 1972) was an English professional footballer who played as an inside forward, a centre forward or an outside forward in the Football League for Bradford Park Avenue, Leicester City, Clapton Orient and Hartlepools United, in non-League football for Royal Artillery, Pontypridd and York City and in Scottish football for Raith Rovers, Hearts and Clydebank.

References

1894 births
Footballers from Bradford
1972 deaths
English footballers
Association football forwards
Bradford (Park Avenue) A.F.C. players
Raith Rovers F.C. players
Heart of Midlothian F.C. players
Clydebank F.C. (1914) players
Pontypridd F.C. players
Leicester City F.C. players
Leyton Orient F.C. players
Hartlepool United F.C. players
York City F.C. players
English Football League players
Scottish Football League players